Taluri or Telori may refer to:

Taluri-ye Olya
Taluri-ye Sofla